The photoplayer is an automatic mechanical orchestra used by movie theatres to produce photoplay music to accompany silent films.

Operation
The central instruments in a photo player were a piano and percussion; some machines also added pipe organs and methods for manually creating sound effects. Like a player piano, the photo player played music automatically by reading piano rolls (rolls of paper with perforations), but the photo player could hold two rolls: one that would play while the other was prepared. Common sound effects included gunshots, bells and drums, which were generated by pulling chains called "cow-tails". Some photo players feature electric sound effects, such as sirens, automobile horns, and other oddities. A photo player operator had to load the paper rolls, start the machine and add the manual sound effects and percussion using the cow-tails.

History
Approximately 8,000 to 10,000 photoplayers were produced during the boom era of silent films, between 1910 and 1928. Around a dozen manufacturers produced the instruments, including the American Photo Player Company, which made the Fotoplayer; the Operators Piano Company of Chicago, which made the Reproduco; The Bartola Musical Instrument Company of Oshkosh, Wisconsin, maker of the Bartola; Seeburg; and Wurlitzer. The popularity of the photoplayer sharply declined in the mid-1920s as silent films were replaced by sound films, and few machines still exist today.

See also
Theatre organs: played by an organist, they could produce a wider range of sound and were popular in larger theatres
American Fotoplayer, a type of photoplayer by the American Photo Player Co.

References

External links
 Glenwood Vaudeville Revue Wurlitzer
 Joe Rinaudo playing the American Fotoplayer on "California's Gold with Huell Howser"
 Silent Cinema Society - American Fotoplayer
 American Treasure Tour Museum -  Seeburg "R" Fhotoplayer

Silent film music
Film music